Zsolt Páling (born 16 February 1969) is a retired Hungarian football midfielder. He was a squad member for the 1985 FIFA World Youth Championship and was capped for Hungary.

References

1969 births
Living people
Hungarian footballers
Ferencvárosi TC footballers
III. Kerületi TUE footballers
Diósgyőri VTK players
Nemzeti Bajnokság I players
Association football midfielders
Hungary youth international footballers
Hungary international footballers
Footballers from Budapest